Tøger Seidenfaden (28 April 1957 – 27 January 2011) was a Danish journalist and political scientist, and, from 1993 until his death, editor-in-chief of the broadsheet newspaper Politiken. His father, Erik Seidenfaden, was also a journalist and was editor-in-chief of the newspaper Dagbladet Information.

He was editor-in-chief of Weekendavisen between 1987 and 1992 and managing director of TV 2 from 1992 to 1993. He was a long-time Bilderberg-attendee, and member of the Trilateral Commission's Executive Committee.

References

External links
 Illustreret Bunker, October 2004  (interview with Seidenfaden, "En moderat ekstremist", pp. 18-19)
 Hvilket Europa? 

1957 births
2011 deaths
Deaths from cancer in Denmark
Politiken editors
Weekendavisen people
Aarhus University alumni
Members of the Steering Committee of the Bilderberg Group
Yale University alumni
Place of birth missing
Place of death missing